Lalgarh Government College, established in 2014, is the government-funded college in Jhargram district. It offers undergraduate courses in arts. It is affiliated to Vidyasagar University.

Departments

Arts

Bengali
English
History
Philosophy
Sanskrit
Political Science
Santali
Sociology

See also

References

External links

Vidyasagar University
University Grants Commission
National Assessment and Accreditation Council

Colleges affiliated to Vidyasagar University
Educational institutions established in 2014
Universities and colleges in Jhargram district
2014 establishments in West Bengal